The Old Battle Creek Post Office is a former post office located at 67 East Michigan Avenue in Battle Creek, Michigan. It was listed on the National Register of Historic Places in 1972.

History
In 1904, Congress appropriated funds for the construction of a new post office in Battle Creek. Albert Kahn was chosen as the architect, one of the first commissions he completed after opening his own Detroit office. Kahn produced plans for the building by the end of the year. Contractor Charles A. Howind was awarded the contract to complete the building, and it was dedicated in 1907. In 1930–1931, an addition was constructed, carefully following the style of the original, which approximately doubled the post office's size. In 1968, a new post office was built and the old one vacated. It was eventually refurbished into office space.

Description
The old Battle Creek Post Office is a stone-and-brick structure measuring approximately 112 feet long and 75 feet deep. The 1930–1931 addition, although carefully matched in style, obscures the symmetry of the original design. Stone quoins run along the corners, and a stone balustrade and a denticulated stone cornice run across the top. Both the original structure and the matching addition have two stone arched windows measuring approximately 8 feet wide and 16 feet high, decorated with a cast-iron grillwork.

References

		
National Register of Historic Places in Calhoun County, Michigan
Renaissance Revival architecture in Michigan
Buildings and structures completed in 1907